SP-197  is a state highway in the state of São Paulo in Brazil. It connects Brotas with Torrinha.

References

Highways in São Paulo (state)